Konbek is a  boma in  Makuach payam, Bor Central County, Jonglei State, South Sudan, about 15 kilometers east of Bor.

Demographics
According to the Fifth Population and Housing Census of Sudan, conducted in April 2008, Konbek  boma had a population of 8,951 people, composed of 4,624 male and 4,327 female residents.

Education
The Ayak Anguei Girls Primary Boarding School was located in Konbek until 2013, when it was first damaged by a tornado and then forced by  armed conflict to close. The school was one of only two all-girls boarding school in the region, and one of the few in South Sudan.  The school was built in 2008 and had an enrollment of 600 students in 2009.

Notes

References 

Populated places in Jonglei State